Romik Khachatryan (born on 23 August 1978 in Yerevan) is an Armenian retired
football player. He was formerly a member of the Armenia national team.

Club career
Romik Khachatryan began to get involved in football at age 7. Khachatryan began his youth career in SKA-Arai Echmiadzin. The then 16-year-old player played for the club for 11 games and was able to score 2 goals in the 1994 season. The club performed poorly that season, taking 14th place in the Armenian Premier League and was sent to the Armenian First League. Khachatryan joined Kilikia Yerevan. The club, who were soon merged with Pyunik Yerevan, played in season informal and formal, respectively. Following 1996, he joined BKMA Yerevan and stayed at the club for a long time. His first season for the club was initially not good. They had 7 defeats at the start of the Premier League. In the first round, the team finished with one win and 10 losses. Moreover, after the first match of the second round, the club withdrew from the championship and disbanded. Khachatryan himself played only three games and returned to Pyunik. From this period, Khachatryan went to take his career elsewhere. Successful performance for the club provided the opportunity to play in the Armenia national team. At the end of the 1998 Armenian Premier League, he made a transition into Araks Ararat. His skills developed in the new club and he was allowed half of the season to move to the Cypriot First Division. He played for Cypriot clubs Olympiakos Nicosia, APOEL Nicosia and Anorthosis Famagusta. He also returned to Armenia to play for Banants Yerevan, which made it to the finals of the 2008 Armenian Cup. Khachatryan currently plays for Lokomotiv Tashkent.

International career
Khachatryan played in 54 matches in the Armenia national football team. He made his debut on 30 March 1997 in Tbilisi in a friendly game between Armenia and Georgia. In this match, Khachatryan substituted in, replacing Arthur Petrosyan at the 60th minute of the match. The Armenian team suffered a devastating defeat 0:7. To his credit, he had scored a goal once in a match against Andorra. Khachatryan has played the 7th most games for the national team.

Personal life
Romik was born to parents Akop and Manushak. He is married and has two children, twins Eric and Helen.

National team statistics

Honours

Club
Pyunik Yerevan
Armenian Premier League (2): 1995–96, 1996–97
Armenian Cup (1): 1996
Armenian Supercup (1): 1997
Armenian Cup Runner-up (1): 1997

Spartak Yerevan
Armenian Premier League 3rd place (1): 1999
Armenian Cup (1): 1999
Armenian Supercup Runner-up (1): 1999

Banants Yerevan
Armenian Cup Runner-up (1): 2008

Olympiakos Nicosia
Cypriot First Division Runner-up (1): 2000–01

APOEL Nicosia
Cypriot Super Cup (1): 2002

Anorthosis Famagusta
Cypriot Cup (1): 2006–07

References

External links
 
 FFA
 
 armfootball.tripod.com
 

1978 births
Living people
Footballers from Yerevan
Armenian footballers
Armenia international footballers
Armenian expatriate footballers
Olympiakos Nicosia players
APOEL FC players
OFI Crete F.C. players
Anorthosis Famagusta F.C. players
FC Unirea Urziceni players
FC Universitatea Cluj players
APOP Kinyras FC players
FC Urartu players
AEP Paphos FC players
PFC Lokomotiv Tashkent players
Armenian Premier League players
Super League Greece players
Liga I players
Cypriot First Division players
Cypriot Second Division players
Expatriate footballers in Cyprus
Expatriate footballers in Greece
Expatriate footballers in Romania
Expatriate footballers in Uzbekistan
Association football midfielders